The sixth series of Junior Bake Off began on 11 January 2021, with 16 contestants competing to be crowned the series 6 winner. The bakers were divided into two groups of 8, with four eliminated from each group over five days of competition. The remaining four bakers from each group were combined in the week-long finals, culminating in a "super-difficult showdown" episode that determines the winner. Reece won the 2021 series.

Contestants
Source:
 Top 8
 Quarter finalist
 Semi-finalist
 Finalist
 Winner

Results summary 

Source:

Heat 1

Heat 2

Finals

Colour key:

 Baker was one of the judges' least favourite bakers that episode, but was not eliminated.
 Baker was one of the judges' favourite bakers that episode, but was not the Star Baker.
 Baker got through to the next round.
 Baker was eliminated.
 Baker was the Star Baker.
 Baker was a series runner-up.
 Baker was the series winner.

Episodes

 Baker eliminated
 Star Baker
 Winner

Episode 1: Cake

Episode 2: Biscuits

Episode 3: Bread

Episode 4: Dessert

Episode 5: Pastry

Episode 6: Cake

Episode 7: Biscuits

Episode 8: Bread

Episode 9: Dessert

Episode 10: Pastry

Episode 11: Street Food

Episode 12: International

Episode 13: Illusion

Episode 14: Pâtisserie (Semi-final)

Episode 15: Final (Themed Afternoon tea)

Ratings

References

The Great British Bake Off
2021 British television seasons